The Renault Twingo Electric or Twingo Z.E. is a battery electric vehicle, introduced in 2020 by Renault.

After plans to roll out new electric vehicles, including an electric Twingo, were confirmed in September 2019, Renault announced the Twingo Electric, marketed as the Twingo Z.E. (Zero Emissions) and in France as the Twingo E-Tech Électrique, the first-ever electric version of its city car, in February 2020 at the Geneva Motor Show. It is the second electric car from Renault, following the Zoe. The Twingo Z.E. drivetrain is based on that of the Smart EQ Forfour, with a larger battery.

It was not marketed in the United Kingdom, following Renault's withdrawal of the Twingo range from the UK market after the car model's facelift in 2019. A limited edition "Vibes" model, based on the regular "Intens" trim, was announced in July 2020; the special Valencia Orange colour was only available for the Vibes limited edition, but the Vibes could also be specified for any regular production colour, and was later made available for the conventional petrol-engined Twingo. Trim levels in 2022 include the Life, Zen, Intens, and Urban Night.

The on-board charger, branded Caméléon, can accept AC electric supply at up to 22 kW; the lithium-ion battery, with 22 kW-hr capacity, incorporates lessons learned from the Renault Zoe. The battery itself weighs  and is positioned beneath the front seats. The vehicle is limited to AC charging sources only, as the vehicle supply interface port does not accept a DC fast charge plug. The default driving mode "D" emulates the behaviour of a petrol-powered car with moderate "engine braking" when the driver's foot is lifted from the throttle; a more aggressive and adjustable "B" regeneration mode is selectable, but does not allow one-pedal driving at the highest regeneration level.

The base trim ("Life") was criticized for lacking expected basic features such as a radio and air conditioning; however, the lack of vibrations and abundant low-end torque from the electric traction motor were appreciated for city traffic. The Twingo Electric was marketed against other low-cost city cars, such as the Volkswagen E-up! and its rebadged versions, the SEAT Mii electric and Škoda Citigo-e iV; internally, the Twingo also competed with the Dacia Spring; compared to the VW and Dacia, the Twingo Electric offered a smaller driving range.

References

Twingo Electric
2020s cars
City cars
Euro NCAP superminis
Front-wheel-drive vehicles
Hatchbacks